Permafrost Kingdom is a tourist complex in Yakutsk, Sakha Republic, Russia. Established in 2005, the complex is located within a permafrost glacier near Chochur-Muran Mountain and contains displays of ice sculptures of local pagan gods and other characters.

References

External links
Information on Visit-Yakutia.com 

Buildings and structures in the Sakha Republic
Yakutsk
Tourist attractions in the Sakha Republic